Horn Bluff is a prominent rocky headland on the northern side of the coastal island at the western side of Deakin Bay, Antarctica. It was discovered and mapped as part of the mainland by the Australasian Antarctic Expedition (1911–14) under Douglas Mawson, who applied the name for W.A. Horn of Adelaide, a patron of the expedition. The headland was shown to be on an island by Australian National Antarctic Research Expeditions air photos taken in 1962.

References

Headlands of George V Land